Connor Williams (born September 5, 1991) is a former Canadian football defensive lineman. He played for the Ottawa Redblacks of the Canadian Football League (CFL). He was drafted 18th overall in the 2013 CFL Draft by the Ottawa Redblacks and, after completing his college eligibility, signed with the Redblacks on May 28, 2014. He played college football with the Utah State Aggies. He retired from football on July 30, 2018.

References

External links
Ottawa Redblacks bio

Living people
1991 births
Players of Canadian football from British Columbia
Canadian football defensive linemen
Utah State Aggies football players
Ottawa Redblacks players
Sportspeople from North Vancouver
American football defensive linemen